is a Japanese racing driver.

Racing record

Japanese Top Formula Championship results

Complete JGTC/Super GT Results 
(key) (Races in bold indicate pole position) (Races in italics indicate fastest lap)

24 Hours of Le Mans results

References 

1969 births
Living people
Japanese racing drivers
Super GT drivers
Japanese Formula 3000 Championship drivers
24 Hours of Le Mans drivers

Nakajima Racing drivers